The Jnanpith Award is the oldest and the highest Indian literary award presented annually by the Bharatiya Jnanpith to an author for their "outstanding contribution towards literature". Instituted in 1961, the award is bestowed only on Indian writers writing in Indian languages included in the Eighth Schedule to the Constitution of India and English, with no posthumous conferral.

From 1965 till 1981, the award was given to the authors for their "most outstanding work" and consisted of a citation plaque, a cash prize and a bronze replica of Saraswati, the Hindu goddess of knowledge and wisdom. The first recipient of the award was the Malayalam writer G. Sankara Kurup who received the award in 1965 for his collection of poems, Odakkuzhal (The Bamboo Flute), published in 1950.

The award has been conferred upon fifty-eight writers including seven women authors. In 1976, Bengali novelist Ashapoorna Devi became the first woman to win the award and was honoured for the 1965 novel Prothom Protishruti (The First Promise), the first in a trilogy. The most recent recipients of the award are Assamese poet Nilmani Phookan and Konkani writer Damodar Mauzo, awarded for the years of 2021 and 2022 respectively.

Background

The Bharatiya Jnanpith, a research and cultural institute founded in 1944 by industrialist Sahu Shanti Prasad Jain of the Sahu Jain family, conceived an idea in May 1961 to start a scheme "commanding national prestige and of international standard" to "select the best book out of the publications in Indian languages". Later in November, Rama Jain, the Founder President of the Bharatiya Dnyanpith, invited a few literary experts to discuss various aspects of the scheme. Jain along with Kaka Kalelkar, Harivansh Rai Bachchan, Ramdhari Singh Dinkar, Jainendra Kumar, Jagdish Chandra Mathur, Prabhakar Machwe, Akshaya Kumar Jain, and Lakshmi Chandra Jain presented the initial draft to the then President of India Rajendra Prasad who had shown interest in the scheme's implementation. The idea was also discussed at the 1962 annual sessions of the All India Gujarati Sahitya Parishad and the Bharatiya Bhasha Parishad.

On 2 April 1962, around 300 writers of various Indian languages were invited to Delhi for the two sessions conducted by Dharamvir Bharati in which the draft was finalised and later presented to Prasad. The first award selection committee meeting was scheduled on 16 March 1963 and Prasad was appointed as its president. However, Prasad died on 28 February 1963 and thus the scheduled meeting was chaired by Kalelkar and Sampurnanand acted as president of the committee.

The first Selection Board consisted of Kalelkar, Niharranjan Ray, Karan Singh, R. R. Diwakar, V. Raghavan, B. Gopal Reddy, Harekrushna Mahatab, Rama Jain, and Lakshmi Chandra Jain and was headed by Sampurnanand. Works that were published between 1921 and 1951 were considered for the first award. The nine language committees that were formed were to submit to the board nominations along with translations of the work into Hindi or English. The final round had four authors; Kazi Nazrul Islam (Bengali), D. V. Gundappa (Kannada), Viswanatha Satyanarayana (Telugu), and G. Sankara Kurup (Malayalam). In his acceptance speech, Kurup appreciated the concept of the new award and thanked it for bringing "integration of the diverse people of this land on a spiritual plane".

Rules and selection process

The nominations for the award are received from various literary experts, teachers, critics, universities, and numerous literary and language associations. Every three years, an advisory committee is constituted for each of the languages. The language of the most recent recipient's work is not eligible for consideration for the next two years. Each committee consists of three literary critics and scholars of their respective languages. All the nominations are scrutinised by the committee and their recommendations are submitted to the Jnanpith Award Selection Board 

The Selection Board consists of between seven and eleven members of "high repute and integrity". Each member is part of the committee for a term of three years which can also be extended further for two more terms. The recommendations of all language advisory committees are evaluated by the board based on complete or partial translations of the selected writings of the proposed writers into Hindi or English. The recipient for a particular year is announced by the Selection Board, which has final authority in selection.

List of recipients

See also
 Moortidevi Award, another annual literary award conferred by the Bharatiya Jnanpith.

Notes

References

Bibliography

Further reading

External links

 

Awards established in 1961
Events of The Times Group
Indian literary awards

1961 establishments in Delhi